SarSar-1 is a Sudanese 4x4 APC.

Country of origin

Military Industry Corporation

General Specification

combat weight	5500 kg
Unload weight	4700 kg
Crew	11 persons

Engine

Model	D4DA
Type	4 cylinder in-line, water cooled
Power	139 hp/2.900
fuel tank capacity	106 lit.
Torque	Max:38.0 kg.m/1.600 rpm
Armament	14.5mm or 12.7mm

Protection

Protection	CEN level BR6
flor	2xDM51 grenades

Dimensions

Length	5150mm
Width	1782mm
Height (top of turret)	2600mm

Speed

Max road speed	80 km/hr
Suspension	Front: Leaf Spring & Solid Axe
Rear	Leaf Spring &Solid Axe
Tyres	36"-12.5R 16.5T

Additional options automotive

Run flt tires (4/5 wheels)	
Air condition System

Radio system

Type	STR 22000
Distance Range	10 km

Military of Sudan
Military vehicles

References